1956–57 was the forty-fourth occasion on which the Lancashire Cup completion had been held.
Oldham won the trophy  by beating St. Helens by the score of 10-3
The match was played at Central Park, Wigan, (historically in the county of Lancashire). The excellent attendance was 39,544 and receipts were £6,274 
This was the first of Oldham's three consecutive triumphs. 1958 would be the last time they would win the trophy, although they did later appear 4 times as runners-up (in 1966, 1969, 1987 and 1989

Background 

With the invitation to junior club “County Amateurs”, the number of clubs remained the same at 15.
The same pre-war fixture format was retained, and due to the number of clubs this resulted in one bye in the first round.

Competition and results

Round 1 
Involved  7 matches (with one bye but no “blank” fixture) and 15 clubs

Round 2 - quarterfinals 
Involved 3 matches (with no bye) and 8 clubs

Round 3 – semifinals  
Involved 2 matches and 4 clubs

Final

Teams and scorers 

Scoring - Try = three (3) points - Goal = two (2) points - Drop goal = two (2) points

The road to success

Notes and comments 
1 * County Amateurs were a Junior (amateur) club from ??
2 * Central Park was the home ground of Wigan with a final capacity of 18,000, although the record attendance was  47,747 for Wigan v St Helens 27 March 1959

See also 
1956–57 Northern Rugby Football League season
Rugby league county cups

References

External links
Saints Heritage Society
1896–97 Northern Rugby Football Union season at wigan.rlfans.com
Hull&Proud Fixtures & Results 1896/1897
Widnes Vikings - One team, one passion Season In Review - 1896-97
The Northern Union at warringtonwolves.org

1956 in English rugby league
RFL Lancashire Cup